The second season of Two and a Half Men originally aired between September 2004 and May 2005. The season consisted of 24 episodes. The DVD was released on January 8, 2008.

Production
The show is produced by Chuck Lorre Productions and Warner Brothers Television. The executive producers in this season were Chuck Lorre and Lee Aronsohn. Gary Halvorson, Asaad Kelada, Pamela Fryman and J.D. Lobue were directors in this season; Lorre and Aronsohn were head writers. Other writers in this season were Susan Beavers, Don Foster, Eddie Gorodetsky, Mark Roberts and Jeff Abugov.

Awards and nominations
This season was nominated for six Primetime Emmy Awards and won one Creative Arts Emmy Awards for Outstanding Multi-Camera Sound Mixing for a Series or Special. Conchata Ferrell and Holland Taylor received Emmy nominations for Outstanding Supporting Actress in a Comedy Series. Charlie Sheen was nominated for a Golden Globe Award for Best Performance by an Actor in a Television Series-Musical or Comedy. This season also won the BMI TV Music Awards for the show's theme song. It also won another music award, the ASCAP Film Award and Television Music Awards. It was also nominated for a GLAAD Media Award.

Cast

Main
 Charlie Sheen as Charlie Harper
 Jon Cryer as Alan Harper
 Angus T. Jones as Jake Harper
 Marin Hinkle as Judith Harper
 Melanie Lynskey as Rose
 Conchata Ferrell as Berta
 Holland Taylor as Evelyn Harper

Guest
 Sean Penn as himself
 Elvis Costello as himself
 Harry Dean Stanton as himself
 Ryan Stiles as Dr. Melnick
 Missi Pyle as Mrs. Pasternak
 Jeri Ryan as Sherri
 Camryn Manheim as Daisy
 Denise Richards as Lisa
 Jodi Lyn O'Keefe as Gail
 Jennifer Taylor as Tina
 Paget Brewster as Jamie Eckleberry
 Lucy Lawless as Pamela
 Chloe Webb as Trudy
 Orson Bean as Norman

Episodes

Ratings
This season was the highest rated season of Two and a Half Men, with an estimate viewership of 16.5 million. Also, the episode "Squab, Squab, Squab, Squab, Squab", received the show's second highest viewership with 24.2 million viewership, only surpassed by the ninth season's premiere, "Nice to Meet You, Walden Schmidt" with 28.74 million.

References

General references 
 
 
 

Season 2
2004 American television seasons
2005 American television seasons